Cré-sur-Loir (literally Cré on Loir; before 2014: Cré) is a former commune in the Sarthe department in the Pays de la Loire region in north-western France. On 1 January 2017, it was merged into the new commune Bazouges Cré sur Loir. Its population was 778 in 2019.

See also
Communes of the Sarthe department

References

Former communes of Sarthe